Cillian Murphy on stage and screen:

Film

Television

Music videos

Video games

Theatre

References

Male actor filmographies
Irish filmographies